The American South Conference men's basketball tournament was the conference championship tournament in men's basketball for the American South Conference (ASC). The tournament was held annually between 1988 and 1991, after which most of the conference's members were absorbed into the Sun Belt Conference.

Tournament results

Finals appearances by school

References